Sto let odinochestva is the second album by Russian psychedelic rock band Egor i Opizdenevshie. It was released in 1993 by Zolotaja Dolina.

Egor Letov stated the track "Ophelia" was one of his favourite songs. In 2008, after Letov died, his brother Sergei said that the song was written about Yanka Dyagileva. The track "Peredozirovka" was written in 1991 after the death of the younger Letov's cat, who had lived for 11 years. Cats are a recurring motif throughout Letov's work. "Tuman" was previously featured in 1990 on Kommunizm's 14th and final album Khronika pikiruyushchego bombardirovshchika. Reversed and instrumental versions of the track appear on their 13th album Trinadtsat, also released in 1990.

Shortly after the album's release, the band started work on a third album, but they halted work on it, changing their name to Grazhdanskaya Oborona and beginning to play live. The album would not be released until 2001.

Track listing

Legacy 
In 1995, the album won the "Bronzovy volchok" award for best cover art. Letov was not present at the ceremony.

When Misteria Zvuka reissued the album in 2007, Letov decided to replace some tracks with versions he thought sounded better. The versions as originally released were included as bonus tracks on Pryg-skok. These versions were also carried over to the 2014 reissue on Wyrgorod.

References

External links 
 Sto let odinochestva at Discogs

1993 albums